Informed Decision (foaled February 5, 2005 in Kentucky) is an American Thoroughbred racehorse who won the 2009 Breeders' Cup Filly & Mare Sprint on her way to being named the American Champion Female Sprint Horse.

Background
Informed Decision is a gray mare who was bred by Charles Kidder and Nancy Cole in Kentucky. She is sired by Kentucky Derby winner Monarchos, becoming his first Grade I winner. Her dam is Palangana, by His Majesty. She was sold at the 2006 Keeneland yearling sale for $150,000, then was resold at the Fasig-Tipton sale as a two-year-old for $320,000. She was trained by Jonathan E. Sheppard and owned by George W. Strawbridge, Jr.'s Augustin Stable.

Racing career
Informed Decision did not start racing until age three, but won in her first start on January 3, 2008 at Gulfstream Park. She finished the year with five wins from seven starts, including setting a new track record of 1:20.86 for the seven furlong distance on the polytrack surface at Keeneland in the Grade II Raven Run Stakes.

At age four, she won six of seven starts, including the Grade I Humana Distaff Handicap and Vinery Madison Stakes. Her only loss of the year came in the Ballerina Stakes on a sloppy track. On November 6, 2009, she entered the Breeders' Cup Filly & Mare Sprint, where she was the second betting choice behind defending champion Ventura. Informed Decision got the early jump on her rival, then withstood Ventura's late charge to win by over a length. For her performances in 2009, Informed Decision was voted the Eclipse Award as the American Champion Female Sprint Horse.

Informed Decision returned to racing at age five in 2010 but managed only three wins from eight starts. The highlights were wins in the Grade III Chicago Handicap and Presque Isle Downs Masters Stakes. She finished seventh when attempting to defend her title in the Filly & Mare Sprint.

Retirement
Informed Decision became a broodmare in 2011, delivering her first foal, a bay colt by Street Cry, on March 11, 2012.

References

 Informed Decision at the NTRA
 Informed Decision at Breeders' Cup.com with race video

2005 racehorse births
Thoroughbred family 1-l
Racehorses bred in Kentucky
Racehorses trained in the United States
Breeders' Cup Filly & Mare Sprint winners
Eclipse Award winners